Megalobulimus grandis, also known as the Brazilian land snail, is a species of air-breathing land snail, a terrestrial gastropod mollusk in the family Strophocheilidae. This species is endemic to Brazil.

References

grandis
Endemic fauna of Brazil
Taxonomy articles created by Polbot
Gastropods described in 1885